Henry Hicks may refer to:

 Henry A. Hicks (died 1927), American labor union leader and political activist
 Henry Hicks (Nova Scotia politician) (1915–1990), lawyer, university administrator, and politician in Nova Scotia
 Henry Hicks (geologist) (1837–1899), Welsh physician, surgeon and geologist
 Hal Hicks (Henry Hicks, 1900–1965), Canadian professional ice hockey player
 Harry Hicks (athlete) (1925–2012), British Olympic runner
 Henry Tempest Hicks (1852–?), British soldier